This is a list of members (MSPs) returned to the second Scottish Parliament at the 2003 Scottish Parliament election. Of the 129 members, 73 were elected from first past the post constituencies with a further 56 members being returned from eight regions, each electing seven MSPs as a form of mixed member proportional representation.

The 2nd Scottish Parliament produced a second hung parliament and became colloquially known as the Rainbow Parliament. This was due to the 2003 election producing a result whereby the incoming members represented the largest number of political parties, with wide-ranging views from across the political spectrum, to be elected at a national level in Scotland. The governing Labour – Liberal Democrat coalition continued in government for a second term.

Composition 

Government coalition parties denoted with bullets (•)

Graphical representation
These are graphical representations of the Scottish Parliament showing a comparison of party strengths as it was directly after the 2003 election and its composition at the time of its dissolution in April 2007:

  

Note this is not the official seating plan of the Scottish Parliament.

List of MSPs
This is a list of MSPs at dissolution.  For a list of MSPs elected in the 2003 election see here. The changes table below records all changes in party affiliation during the session.

Former MSPs

Changes

See also
 2003 Scottish Parliament election
 Executive of the 2nd Scottish Parliament
 Scottish Parliament
 Member of the Scottish Parliament

References

External links
 Scottish Parliament website
 Current and previous Members of the Scottish Parliament (MSPs), on the Scottish Parliament website

2
 

gd:Buill-Pàrlamaid na h-Alba, 2003-2007
sco:Commissioners tae the Scots Pairlament